Chuck or Charles Courtney may refer to:

Chuck Courtney (actor) (1930–2000), actor who starred in low-budget Westerns and dramas of the 1950s, 1960s and 1970s
Chuck Courtney (golfer) (born 1940), American golfer
Charles E. Courtney (1849–1920), American rower and rowing coach
C. F. Courtney (Charles Frederick Courtney, died 1941), English metallurgist

See also
Charles Courtney Curran (1861–1942), American painter
Charles Courtenay, 19th Earl of Devon (born 1975), English nobleman and attorney, resident in the U.S.